White Thunder may refer to:

original title of The Viking (1931 film)
White Thunder, a 2002 documentary about Varick Frissell, producer of The Viking
White Thunder (film), a 1925 film starring Yakima Canutt
nickname of Scott Steiner, American professional wrestler
White Thunder, Cheyenne medicine man and father of Owl Woman